Bonnet orchid may refer to:

 Cryptostylis erecta, an orchid native to south eastern Australia
 Pleurothallis, a genus of orchids many of which have rib-like stems
 Trichosalpinx, a genus of neotropical orchids